Zao Dam may also refer to:

 Zao Dam (Pakistan), dam in Pakistan
 Zao Dam (Shiga, Japan), dam in Japan
 Zao Dam (Yamagata, Japan), dam in Japan